Collegeville is the former name for the community of Ashdale, a community in Antigonish County, Nova Scotia, Canada.

The Environment Canada weather station in Ashdale retains the name Collegeville. The Collegeville post office opened June 1, 1887 and closed February 29, 1932. During the 2nd World War, the weather station and the Ashdale school shared accommodations at the old school house at 15 Ashdale school road now owned by the Wallace family. Of note, the highest temperature ever recorded in NS was at this location. On August 19, 1935 a temperature of 38.3 was recorded at the schoolhouse in Ashdale.

Climate

References

Communities in Antigonish County, Nova Scotia